Palais des Thés is a tea company founded in Paris in 1987. It has 45 specialty tea shops in France, Japan, Israel, Ireland, Norway, Belgium and Germany. The company specializes in direct tea sourcing and commercialization of more than 200 teas as well as tea gifts and accessories.

History

Origins 
François-Xavier Delmas founded Palais des Thés in 1987. His goal was to democratize tea and help the Occident to learn more about its cultural and gastronomical aspects. The first shop opens in the 6th arrondissement of Paris.

Palais des Thés shops 
Most of Palais des Thés shops include three spaces: the tea wall where 100+ teas are available in bulk, a gift section and a third section dedicated to the tea accessories (including teapots, cups, strainers, etc.).

In 1991, Palais des Thés opened its first store outside of France, in Tokyo. Palais des Thés then opened new shops in Brussels (2001 and 2007), Oslo (2006 and 2007), Dublin (2008), Ljubljana (2009) and Tel-Aviv (2010).
The Dublin store has been closed for several years now.

In 2011, Aurelie Pasquet and Cyrille Bessiere launched Palais des Thés in the USA.

In March 2016, they opened "L'Appartement" in the heart of SoHo, NYC (107 Spring Street New York NY 10012) where tea enthusiasts can attend tea classes and taste more than 150 teas.

References 

 Le Guide Théophile Le Palais des Thés - 2008 - Dépot légal : janvier 2002 - 
 The Theophile Guide - Legal registration: March 2003 - 
 Le guide de dégustation de l’amateur de thé François-Xavier Delmas, Mathias Minet et Christine Barbaste - Les Editions du Chêne - 2007 - Dépot légal : 84527, mai 2007 - 
 The Tea lover’s guide - Legal registration: 84528, March 2007 -

External links 
 Company Website

Tea companies of France
French brands
Shops in Paris